Elections to the new People's National Assembly were held in Algeria on 25 February 1977. They were the first parliamentary elections since 1964, as the previous National Assembly had been dissolved in 1965, and were held as a result of the country's new constitution and electoral law being promulgated the year before.

The new Assembly had 261 members, elected from 160 constituencies (daira). Constituencies with less than 80,000 inhabitants had one representative; constituencies with more than 80,000 residents had one extra representative for every 20,000 inhabitants over 80,000.

As the country was a one-party state at the time, the National Liberation Front was the only party to run in the election. It put forward 783 candidates (of which 39 were women), and claimed all 261 seats (nine of which went to female candidates). 6,037,537 of the country's 7,960,000 registered voters (75.84%) took part in the election.

References

Elections in Algeria
Algeria
1977 in Algeria
One-party elections
February 1977 events in Africa